John M. Bethea State Forest is a 37,736-acre state forest in Sanderson, Florida, in northern Baker County near the Florida/Georgia border. It provides a wildlife corridor between the Okefenokee National Wildlife Refuge and the Osceola National Forest. The area was acquired by the State of Florida in 2001, and was named after a member of the forestry department who served between 1970 and 1987.

See also
List of Florida state forests

References

External links
 John M. Bethea State Forest - official site
 U.S. Geological Survey Map at the U.S. Geological Survey Map Website. Retrieved January 6th, 2023.

Florida state forests
Protected areas of Baker County, Florida
Protected areas established in 2001
2001 establishments in Florida